Sir David Herbert Penry-Davey (16 May 1942 – 10 October 2015) was a judge of the High Court of England and Wales.

He was educated at Hastings Grammar School and at King's College London (LLB, 1964). He was called to the Bar at Inner Temple in 1965. He was made a Crown Court recorder in 1986, a QC in 1988, and a judge of the High Court of Justice (Queen's Bench Division) in 1997.

He died on 10 October 2015.

References

1942 births
2015 deaths
Alumni of King's College London
Fellows of King's College London
Queen's Bench Division judges
21st-century English judges
English King's Counsel
Knights Bachelor
Members of the Inner Temple
20th-century King's Counsel
People educated at Hastings Grammar School
20th-century English lawyers